Renee Pack is an American politician serving as a member of the Indiana House of Representatives from the 92nd district. She assumed office on November 4, 2020.

Early life and education 
Pack was born in Nashville, Tennessee and graduated from Whites Creek High School. She earned a Bachelor of Business Administration from Indiana Wesleyan University and a Master of Arts in educational leadership from Indiana University–Purdue University Indianapolis.

Career 
Pack served in the United States Army from 1986 to 1991. Since 2005, she has worked as a community liaison for the Metropolitan School District of Wayne Township. She also worked as a behavioral specialist and drug and alcohol counselor. She was elected to the Indiana House of Representatives in November 2020. She is the ranking member of the House Veterans Affairs and Public Safety Committee.

References 

Living people
People from Nashville, Tennessee
Democratic Party members of the Indiana House of Representatives
Indiana Wesleyan University alumni
Indiana University–Purdue University Indianapolis alumni
Women state legislators in Indiana
African-American state legislators in Indiana
African-American women in politics
21st-century American politicians
21st-century American women politicians
Year of birth missing (living people)
21st-century African-American women
21st-century African-American politicians